Tambour (French language: drum, from Arabic tunbur "lute, drum", Persian tabir "drum") can refer to:

In music
Tambour, a long drum used in Puerto Rican music
Tambour, a snare drum used in Galician music
Tambour (guitar technique) (or tambora), in Flamenco and classical guitar

Other uses
 Tambour, in classical architecture, the inverted bell of a Corinthian capital
 Tambour desk, a desk with desktop drawers and pigeonholes, resembling a bureau à gradin
 Tambour lace, a sewing technique made by stretching a fine net over a frame
 Tambour (company), an Israeli manufacturer of paint, coatings, and construction materials
Tambour, a buttress-like feature on the hazard side of a real tennis court

See also
 Tambourine
 Tabor (instrument)
 Tambora (disambiguation)
 Tambor-class submarine, an American submarine class
 Jeffrey Tambor, actor